James Mullin (1846–1920) was born in Cookstown, County Tyrone. He left school at the age of eleven and worked on a farm, after which he spent nine years as a carpenter. He was one of the first recruits of the Fenian Brotherhood which he joined in 1865. Aged 22, he worked his way whilst attending the Cookstown Academy.

He earned a Bachelor of Arts degree at Queen's College, Galway. He tutored students to fund himself for the degree of Doctor of Medicine. He later practised in London and Cardiff, where he was chairman of the local branch of the United Irish League. At one period of his life he served as a ship's surgeon.

A journalist later in life, he wrote an autobiography, The Story of a Toiler's Life, which was published posthumously in 1921 and reprinted in 2000 as part of University College Dublin's Classics of Irish History series.

Quote
Although he was a Catholic, he attended a Protestant school. Of this experience he was quoted as saying:

References

External links
 Ulster Biography

1846 births
1920 deaths
People from Cookstown
19th-century Irish medical doctors
Irish journalists
United Irish League people
Members of the Irish Republican Brotherhood